Intensified is an album by Desmond Dekker & the Aces released in 1970.

Track listing
All tracks composed by Desmond Dekker; except where indicated
"It Mek" (Dekker, Leslie Kong) - 1:40
"Too Much Too Soon" (Dekker, Leslie Kong) - 2:38
"Coconut Water" - 3:27
"Sweet Music" - 2:29
"My Lonely World" - 3:16
"Rude Boy Train" (Dekker, Leslie Kong) - 2:16
"Poor Me Israelites" - 2:47
"It Is Not Easy" (Dekker, Leslie Kong) - 2:13
"Intensified" (Dekker, Leslie Kong) - 2:43
"Nincompoop" - 2:11
"Tips of My Fingers" (Bill Anderson) - 3:27
"Wise Man" - 2:15

References

1970 albums
Desmond Dekker albums
Albums produced by Leslie Kong